Ebi or EBI may refer to:

People

Given name or nickname 
 Ebi (born 1949), Iranian pop singer
 Ebi Dishnica (born 1984), Albanian basketball player
 Ebi Ere (born 1981), American-Nigerian basketball player
 Ebi Sukore (born 1983), Nigerian footballer
 Euzebiusz Smolarek (born 1981), Polish footballer
 Susumu Yokota (died 2015), Japanese musician

Surname 
 Akiko Ebi (born 1953), Japanese pianist
 Ndudi Ebi (born 1984), Nigerian–British basketball player
 Onome Ebi (born 1983), Nigerian footballer

Places 
 Ebi Lake, in Xinjiang, China
 Ebi River, in Funabashi, Chiba Prefecture, Japan
 Ebi Station, in Kofu, Tottori Prefecture, Japan

Education 
 École de Biologie Industrielle, an engineering school in Cergy, France
 Elim Bible Institute, in Lima, New York, United States
 Evangelical Bible Institute, now the Savannah Christian Preparatory School, in Georgia, United States

Other uses 
 Encyclopædia Britannica, Inc., a publisher
 Energy Biosciences Institute, at the University of California, Berkeley
 European Bioinformatics Institute, of the European Molecular Biology Laboratory
 External Bus Interface, a computer bus
  ("Extra Security Institution"), the maximum-security portion of the Dutch Nieuw Vosseveld prison